Wierzbie  (German Wiersbie) is a village in the administrative district of Gmina Koszęcin, within Lubliniec County, Silesian Voivodeship, in southern Poland. The village has a population of 386.

References

Wierzbie